Barbed Wire Soul is the only studio album by English rock band Blackstar, released on 9 June 1998 by Prosthetic Records. In the United States, the band was credited as Blackstar Rising.

Track listing 

 Bonus tracks 15-19 are demo versions.

Personnel 
 Ken Owen – drums, vocals
 Jeffrey Walker – vocals, bass
 Carlo Regadas – guitars
 Mark Griffiths – guitars

Additional personnel
Colin Richardson - laughter on "Smile", producer
Dave Buchanan - tambourine, cowbell
Martin Smith - bass on "Waste of Space"
Jenny Lamb - saxophone on "Rock 'n' Roll Circus" and "Waste of Space"
Harald Hoffmann - photography
Dirk Rudolph - design, photography
Ian Anderson - mastering
Ewan "Bed'Ed" Davies - engineering
Dave "Da Duke" Buchanan - engineering
Ian T. Tilton - photography

References

1997 albums
Blackstar (band) albums